Anthony "Tony" J. Saliba (born May 5, 1955) is a trader, author, and entrepreneur based out of Chicago, Illinois. He currently serves as CEO of Matrix Holding Group, Mercury Digital Assets, Option Technology Solutions, and Fortify Technologies.

Early life and education
Saliba grew up in the Chicago area. He attended Highland Park High School, where he competed in wrestling, track, and cross country, and edited the school newspaper, graduating in 1973. His interest in trading began in high school when he caddied for grain traders. He graduated as an Evans Scholar from Indiana University's Kelley School of Business with a BS in Accounting in 1977.

Career
Saliba began his career as a stockbroker at a small firm in Indianapolis, Indiana in 1977. In 1979, after learning about the opportunities that existed in options trading, he became a clerk at the Chicago Board Options Exchange (CBOE). After a few months of clerking, a chance encounter on the floor with a trader who he had once caddied for sparked a fateful partnership. The terms of their agreement were simple: Saliba contributed his now-extensive trading knowledge while his acquaintance provided $50,000 in capital. Saliba was soon able to buy out his partner and began building his own trading network. By 1987, he was a director on the CBOE board with 27 traders working for him. In 1989, Saliba was the only options trader profiled in Jack Schwager’s Market Wizards, a classic trading book that features interviews with exceptionally successful traders. He served on CBOE’s Board of Directors until 1990.

In 1989, he founded International Trading Institute, Ltd., a training institution for derivatives traders that built and delivered the first options simulator and pioneered training professional traders and market makers worldwide, and has continued to do so for 30 years.

Saliba founded his first company, First Traders Analytical Solutions, LLC, in 1992 to provide frontend and backend technological solutions for options traders to route and execute trades.

In 1999 Saliba founded and ran LiquidPoint, a trading platform, broker and solution provider that sold to Convergex Group, LLC for a mid-nine-figure sum. He was made executive managing director of Convergex after the acquisition. He is a founding member of Saliba Partners, LLC, a CBOE options trading firm. He also founded Efficient Capital Management, a portfolio investment firm, in 1999.

In 2011, he founded Fortify Technologies, a firm that operates outside of the trading industry. In 2014, he made an overseas investment by purchasing the Lough Erne Resort in Belfast, Northern Ireland. In 2015, he founded Saliba Venture Management, LLC (Saliba Ventures), which offers finance, strategy, and product consulting services.

He served on the board of the Chicago Stock Exchange (CHX) from 2016 until 2018.

Saliba has served as CEO of Matrix Execution Technologies since 2017. Matrix, which formed as a joint venture with Investment Technology Group (ITG), was created as an agency broker-dealer.

Personal and outside interests
Saliba is a board member of the advisory committee at the Reagan Legacy Foundation, the Heritage Foundation, and the American Spectator Magazine. as well as adviser to the Gary Sinise Foundation.

He is also co-owner of the Elite Football League of India and director of the Western Golf Association’s Evans Scholars Foundation, which awards college scholarships to caddies from modest means.

Books
Saliba is the author of three books:

Managing Expectations: Driving Profitable Option Trading Outcomes Through Knowledge, Discipline, and Risk Management (2016)

Option Spread Strategies: Trading Up, Down, and Sideways Markets (2009)

Option Strategies for Directionless Markets: Trading with Butterflies, Iron Butterflies, and Condors (2008)

References

American businesspeople
American writers
1955 births
Living people
Indiana University alumni
People from Highland Park, Illinois